Rohit Bose Roy (born 5 April 1968) is an Indian television and film actor. He is known for his role in Hindi television serials such as Des Mein Niklla Hoga Chand and Swabhimaan.  Besides working in television series, Roy has also acted in notable Bollywood movies such as Kaabil, Ek Khiladi Ek Haseena, Apartment and Plan among others. He starred in the movie Shootout at Lokhandwala, in which he portrayed the character Fattu, one of the gang members. Roy has also directed a short film named Rice Plate – as a part of the anthology film Dus Kahaniyaan. Roy launched his own fashion brand in the year 2020, Rohit Roy for Styched, in association with Styched Life.

Early life and background
Roy is a Bengali and he had spent his formative years in Ahmedabad, Gujarat. He did his schooling from St. Xavier's School, Ahmedabad. He is also an alumnus of St. Xavier's College, Ahmedabad. He is the younger son of businessman Brothindranath and Dolly Bose Roy. His elder brother, Ronit Roy is a well-known television and film actor.

Personal life
Roy married actress Manasi Joshi Roy on 23 June 1999. They have one daughter together, Kiara. He can also speak Gujarati fluently.Rohit is also an avid Vipassana practitioner and has shared his personal views during one of his interviews with Rahul Rao (Govu).

Filmography

Films

Television 

 Tujhpe Dil Qurbaan as Lt. Karan
 Swabhimaan as Rishabh Malhotra
 Kabhie Kabhie as Vijay Sinha
 Waaris
 Saturday Suspense - Haan Maine Coreena Peters Ka Khoon Kiya Hai as Kapil (Episode 95)
 Rishtey – Ajnabee as Aman
 Hera Pheri as Sanjay Premi
 Rishtey – Sparsh as Vineet
 Baat Ban Jaaye as Amit Kapoor
 Gubbare – Bollywood Bite as Roxy
 Milan as Ranbir Kapoor
 Hum Hain Dilwale as Vijay
 Nach Baliye 1 as Contestant 
 Wild Ten as Host
 Jhalak Dikhhla Jaa 2 as Host
 Yeh Hai Jalwa as Contestant
 Jhalak Dikhhla Jaa 3 as Host
 Dil Jeetegi Desi Girl as Host
 Sajda Tere Pyaar Mein as Mahendra Pratap Singh
 Hitler Didi as Major Kabir Chaudhary / Saheb
 Jhalak Dikhhla Jaa 6 as Contestant
 The Bachelorette India as Host 
 Encounter as Senior Inspector Milind Mandlik
 Peterson Hill as Kishorilal Chadda / Jaggu
 Khooni Saaya as Host
 Memories as Siddharth
 Shakti - Astitva Ke Ehsaas Ki as Nishant Bhalla
 Sanjivani as Vardhaan

Dubbing roles

See also
 List of Indian television actors
 List of Indian film actors

References

External links 

 
 
 

1968 births
Living people
Bengali people
Indian male television actors
Indian male film actors
Indian television talk show hosts
Male actors in Hindi cinema
Indian male soap opera actors
Male actors from Ahmedabad
20th-century Indian male actors
21st-century Indian male actors
Actors from Mumbai